Tsushima may refer to:

Places
 Tsushima Island, part of Nagasaki Prefecture
 Tsushima, Nagasaki, a city in Nagasaki Prefecture (coterminous with Tsushima Island)
 Tsushima Province, a historical province, coterminous with modern Tsushima Subprefecture
 Tsushima Subprefecture, an administrative subdivision of Nagasaki prefecture (coterminous with Tsushima Island)
 Tsushima Fuchū Domain, a feudal domain of the early modern period, largely if not entirely contiguous with the Province
 Tsushima Basin, also known as Ulleung Basin, located at the juncture of the Sea of Japan and the Korea Strait
 Tsushima Strait, the eastern channel of the Korea Strait
 Tsushima, Aichi, a city in Aichi Prefecture
 Tsushima, Ehime, a town dissolved in August 2005, formerly located in Ehime Prefecture
 Tsushima Shrine, Aichi Prefecture
 Tsushima Shrine, located in the city of Mitoyo, Kagawa Prefecture and only accessible one day a year in early August

Events
 Battle of Tsushima (1905), also known as the "Sea of Japan Naval Battle", the last sea battle of the Russo-Japanese War
 Tsushima Incident (1861), involving Russia, Japan, and Britain

Ships
 Tsushima Maru, a civilian ship sunk by American naval forces during World War II
 Japanese cruiser Tsushima
 Japanese escort ship Tsushima

People
, Japanese bobsledder
 Keiko Tsushima (1926–2012), Japanese actress
 Leo Tsushima, fictional character in the Tsuyokiss video game and anime
 Mitsutoshi Tsushima (born 1974), Japanese football player
 Ryuta Tsushima or Iwakiyama Ryūta (born 1976), Japanese sumo wrestler
 Shuji Tsushima or Osamu Dazai (1909–1948), Japanese author
 Yoshiko Tsushima, fictional character from the media-mix project Love Live! Sunshine!!
 Yūko Tsushima or Tsushima Satoko (born 1947), Japanese fiction writer, essayist and critic
 Yūji Tsushima (born 1930), Japanese politician

Other uses
 Ghost of Tsushima, a video game released in 2020 for the PlayStation 4
 Tsushima brown frog, a species of frog endemic to Japan
 Tsushima cat, a wild cat
 Tsushima Current, a branch of the Kuroshio Current into the Sea of Japan
 Tsushima dialect, a Japanese dialect spoken on Tsushima Island of Nagasaki Prefecture
 Tsushima salamander, a species of salamander endemic to Japan

Japanese-language surnames